Dickens Athletic Center is a 2,500-seat multi-purpose arena in Chicago, Illinois. 

It was home to the Chicago State University Cougars basketball teams until late 2006, when it was replaced by the Emil and Patricia Jones Convocation Center. It currently hosts the school's volleyball program.

External links
Venue information

Basketball venues in Chicago
College volleyball venues in the United States
Defunct college basketball venues in the United States
Indoor arenas in Illinois
Sports venues in Chicago
Volleyball venues in Chicago